State Road 224 (SR 224) is a four-lane road in Orange Park, Florida.  It connects the unincorporated area on its western end at State Road 21, near the Orange Park Country Club to U.S. Route 17 (US 17).  SR 224 is also known as Kingsley Avenue, named for the early Florida settler and plantation owner Zephaniah Kingsley.

Sites of interest along SR 224 include: Orange Park High School, Orange Park Medical Center, a United States Post Office, the Orange Park Town Hall (on the corner of US 17 and SR 224) and Moosehaven.

Major intersections

References 

224
224